The Government Polytechnic, Awasari Kh is a public polytechnic college in Awasari Kh, Pune, Maharashtra. It is an institution run by the Government of Maharashtra and offers diploma programs in engineering & technology. The college is accredited by the All India Council for Technical Education (AICTE)  and affiliated with the Maharashtra State Board of Technical Education (MSBTE).

Programs Offered
Full Time Diploma Program (3-year):

Campus

The total intake capacity of all these programmes is 420 students. The premises of this institute is spread over 17 acres of land. Accommodation for 336 boys, 288 girls is also available, which is shared with Government College of Engineering and Research, Avasari Khurd.

References

External links
Official website

Universities and colleges in Maharashtra
Education in Pune